Law Men is a 1944 American Western film directed by Lambert Hillyer, and released by Monogram Pictures. This is the eighth film in the "Marshal Nevada Jack McKenzie" series, and stars Johnny Mack Brown as Jack McKenzie and Raymond Hatton as his sidekick Sandy Hopkins, with Jan Wiley, Kirby Grant and Robert Frazer.

The film is also known as Lawmen (American alternative spelling).

Plot
Two United States Marshals ride into the town of Verdine undercover and separately. The town has been plagued by recurring robberies of the same bank and the stagecoach when shipments of gold are aboard. Sandy rides in during a bank robbery in progress and kills one of the robbers. Posing as a cobbler Sandy is dismayed when the town rewards him with the vacant fully equipped shop of the deceased cobbler, a trade Sandy knows nothing about. Jack trails the outlaw gang and poses as an outlaw on the run to join the gang to replace their late member.  Both law men realize that the gang is getting inside information on the bank and the gold shipments and must identify the source before bringing the outlaws to justice.

Cast
Johnny Mack Brown as U.S. Marshal "Nevada" Jack McKenzie
Raymond Hatton as U.S. Marshal "Sandy" Hopkins
Jan Wiley as Phyliss
Kirby Grant as Clyde Miller
Robert Frazer as Banker Bradford
Edmund Cobb as Slade
Art Fowler as Gus, Chief Henchman
Hal Price as "Pop" Haynes
Marshall Reed as Henchman Killifer
Isabel Withers as Auntie Mack
Ben Corbett as Henchman Simmons
Ted Mapes as Curly Balou, Stage Driver
Steve Clark as Henchman Hardy
Bud Osborne as Henchman Wilson

Soundtrack
Raymond Hatton - "The Ballad of Jesse James"

External links

1944 films
American black-and-white films
Monogram Pictures films
1944 Western (genre) films
American Western (genre) films
Films directed by Lambert Hillyer
1940s American films
1940s English-language films